The Ministry of Environment is the ministry is responsible for environmental affairs in the Arab Republic of Egypt. The current minister is Yasmine Fouad.

History
It was established in 1997, and has since focused ministry in cooperation with all development partners to identify environmental vision and outline of environmental policies in Egypt. The policies of the ministry are executed by the Egyptian Environmental Affairs Agency.

Projects
In 2014, the Ministry and Italy signed an agreement to make El Gouna, a Red Sea City, carbon neutral.

In 2017, the European Union and Egypt finalized plans for environmental and other projects valued at 600 million Euros.

In late 2017, the Ministry announced they had seen a reduction of 13-15% in the burning of rice by rice farmers, a practice that causes a black toxic cloud.

In 2021, the Ministry became a member of GWCN (Global Waste Cleaning Network).

See also

 Cabinet of Egypt

References

External links
 Egypt's Cabinet Database

1997 establishments in Egypt
Egypt, Environmental Affairs
Environmental Affairs
Egypt